Trang may refer to:

Places
Trang province, Thailand
Trang, Thailand, capital city of Trang province
Trang Airport
Trang railway station
Trang River
Trang, a sub-district of Mayo district, Pattani province, Thailand
Trang (commune), Battambang province, Cambodia
Trang, Lum Choar, Ratanakiri province, Cambodia

People
Trang (surname), a Vietnamese surname
Trang F.C., a Thai semi-professional football club

See also